Charles Mackenzie may refer to:

Charles Mackenzie (diplomat) (1788–1862), Scottish diplomat, writer and journalist
Charles Mackenzie (bishop) (1825–1862), Church of England bishop of Central Africa
Charles MacKenzie (merchant) (1832–1900), Ontario merchant and politician
Charles Patrick Mackenzie (1924–1986), lecturer in veterinary medicine 
Charles Mackenzie (Australian politician) (1837–1921), member of the Tasmanian House of Assembly
Charles Mackenzie, 19th-century English actor who performed as Henry Compton
Sgt. Charles Stuart MacKenzie, World War I Scottish soldier, subject of the lament -- "Sgt. MacKenzie" -- written and sung by his great-grandson Joseph Kilna Mackenzie

See also
Charles E. McKenzie (1896–1956), U.S. Representative from Louisiana